The Open Container Initiative (OCI) is a Linux Foundation project, started in June 2015 by Docker, to design open standards for operating-system-level virtualization (software containers), most importantly Linux containers.

Initiative
There are currently two specifications in development and in use: Runtime Specification (runtime-spec) and the Image Specification (image-spec).

OCI develops runc, a container runtime that implements their specification and serves as a basis for other higher-level tools. runc was first released in July 2015 as version 0.0.1.

References

External links
 
 

Linux containerization
Linux Foundation projects